Joseph Walton Haynes (September 21, 1917 – January 6, 1967) was an American professional baseball player, coach and front office executive.  A right-handed pitcher, he logged 14 seasons in Major League Baseball as a member of the Washington Senators (1939–40; 1949–52) and Chicago White Sox (1941–48). He married Thelma Mae Robertson Griffith, niece of Washington owner Clark Griffith, in October 1941, ten months after he had been traded to Chicago by his fiancée's uncle.

Life 
Born in Lincolnton, Georgia, Haynes began his pro career in 1937. In 379 games pitched, including 147 games started, Haynes compiled a 76–82 win-loss record, 53 complete games, five shutouts, 159 games finished and 21 saves in 1,581 innings pitched. He allowed 1,672 hits, 823 runs, 704 earned runs, 95 home runs and 620 walks, with 475 strikeouts, 26 hit batsmen, 35 wild pitches, 6,890 batters faced, four balks and a 4.01 ERA.

Haynes was an above average hitting pitcher, posting a career .213 batting average (111-for-521) with 48 runs, 1 home run and 39 RBI. Defensively, he was better than average, recording a .966 fielding percentage which was 9 points higher than the league average at his position.

Of Haynes' 379 appearances, 218 came with the White Sox, where he won 55 of 98 decisions (.561) and posted a solid 3.14 ERA.

He was reacquired by Washington after the 1948 season, but was ineffective, going only 10–21 with a 5.42 ERA in 112 games in his second stint with the Senators.

As a member of the Griffith family whose wife inherited 26 percent of the franchise's stock in 1955, Haynes remained in the Washington organization after his playing career ended.

He served as the Senators' pitching coach from 1953–55, coached in their farm system, then moved into the front office as executive vice president, working with his brother-in-law, club president Calvin Griffith, in Washington and after the team moved to Minneapolis–St. Paul as the Minnesota Twins in 1961. Haynes died in Hopkins, Minnesota, of a heart attack suffered while shoveling snow at the age of 49.

See also
 List of Major League Baseball annual ERA leaders

References

External links

1917 births
1967 deaths
American League ERA champions
Baseball executives
Baseball players from Georgia (U.S. state)
Charlotte Hornets (baseball) players
Chattanooga Lookouts players
Chicago White Sox players
Jacksonville Tars players
Major League Baseball pitchers
Major League Baseball pitching coaches
Minnesota Twins executives
People from Lincolnton, Georgia
Washington Senators (1901–1960) coaches
Washington Senators (1901–1960) executives
Washington Senators (1901–1960) players